Alhaji Usman Alhaji is a Nigerian politician, an educationist and member of the Executive Council of Kano State who is currently serving as Secretary to the State Governor, Dr Abdullahi Umar Ganduje(as of 2022). He is also the Waziri (Chairman of Kingmakers) of Gaya Emirate Council. He is currently the owner of Usman International School, the first all inclusive education institution in Kano State for both normal students and those with all kinds of special needs.

Early life
Alhaji Usman Alhaji was born on the 20th of December 1948 in Birnin Kudu Local Government Area of Kano, now Jigawa State. He attended Gaya Primary school in the year 1956, followed by Birnin Kudu Government Secondary School between 1962 and 1966. He proceeded to Rumfa College, Kano between January 1967 to December 1968 where he did his HSC (Higher School Certificate), which is equivalent to A-levels. Later Usman Alhaji obtained a Bachelor of Arts (Linguistics/Hausa) between 1969-1973 from Ahmadu Bello University Zaria. From 1976 to 1977 he gained his masters in Educational Planning & Administration from Ohio University Athens, USA.

Career
After his National Youth Service Corps (NYSC) between 1973-74 at Asaba, Delta State (then Bendel State), Usman Alhaji started his work experience as an Assistant Lecturer at the College of Advanced Studies, Kano. He also worked with the Institute for Higher Education, Kano, from Assistant Registrar to Deputy Registrar between 1978 and 1980. From 1980 to 1982 he worked as Secretary to Assistant general manager at Hadejia Jama'are River Basin Development Authority, Kano, and later served as Assistant general manager at the same organisation until 1984. Usman Alhaji then became the Director General of Kano States Chamber of commerce (industry and agriculture) from 1985-87.

Political career
Alhaji was the National Secretary of National Republican Convention between 1990 and 1993, he was the commissioner of Education under Governor Rabiu Kwankwaso between 1999 and 2003 He was the Nominee of Peoples Democratic Party of Kano South Senatorial District in 2007 Nigerian general election who lost to Senator Kabiru Ibrahim Gaya of the defunct All Nigeria Peoples Party ANPP now All Progressive Congress APC, Alhaji file a petition before the Election tribunal where court upheld the election of Kabiru Gaya as the Senator Kano South Senatorial District He was also the Nominee of the defunct Congress for Progressive Change CPC which is also merge with ANPP, now called All Progressive Congress APC, Kano South Senatorial District in 2011 Nigerian general election, he also contest for Governor of Kano State in 2015 where step down for the current Governor of Kano State Dr Abdullahi Umar Ganduje in 2014

Secretary to the state government
Alhaji Usman was first appointed to the office Secretary to the State Government by Governor Abdullahi Umar Ganduje of Kano State on 28 May 2016 immediately after the removal of former Secretary to the State Government Rabi'u Suleiman Bichi who was in office for almost 5 years, he was appointed by former Governor Rabiu Kwankwaso since 2011 and retained by Governor Ganduje after his inauguration on 29 May 2015

See also
Executive Council of Kano State

References

1948 births
Ahmadu Bello University alumni
20th-century Nigerian politicians
21st-century Nigerian politicians
Living people
Politicians from Kano
Politicians from Kano State